Poás is a canton in the Alajuela province of Costa Rica. The head city of the canton is San Pedro.

Toponymy 
Named for Poás Volcano.

History 
Poás was created on 15 October 1901 by decree 14.

Geography 
Poás has an area of  km² and a mean elevation of  metres.

The elongated canton sits among the ridges and valleys on the southern slope of Poás Volcano. The Poás and Poasito rivers form its eastern border, while the Prendes and Tacares rivers limit the canton to the west. Poás Volcano is the canton's northernmost point.

Districts 
The canton of Poás is subdivided into the following districts:
 San Pedro
 San Juan
 San Rafael
 Carrillos
 Sabana Redonda

Demographics 

For the 2011 census, Poás had a population of  inhabitants.

Transportation

Road transportation 
The canton is covered by the following road routes:

References 

Cantons of Alajuela Province
Populated places in Alajuela Province